Barbana may refer to:

Places
Barban, Croatia
Barbana, Italy, an island and a Marian sanctuary
Barbana, Slovenia

Ships
, later named